Jack McBean was a Scottish amateur footballer who made 6 appearances for Royal Arsenal between 1889 and 1893. He had previously played in Scotland for Kirkcaldy Wanderers, alongside two other future Arsenal players, David Danskin and Peter Connolly. He later joined the newly founded Royal Ordnance Factories, along with a number of other ex-Arsenal players.

References

Year of birth missing
Year of death missing
Scottish footballers
Arsenal F.C. players
Royal Ordnance Factories F.C. players
Association footballers not categorized by position